Special Affections is the debut album by Canadian musician Diamond Rings. It was released on October 25, 2010.

Special Affections received a nod from Exclaim! as the No. 11 Pop & Rock Album of 2010. The album was also named as a longlisted nominee for the 2011 Polaris Music Prize.

Track listing

"Something Else" Itunes Single Remix E.P.

References

2010 debut albums
Diamond Rings (musician) albums
Secret City Records albums